House Broken, also known as No Place Like Home (working title), is an American comedy film directed by Sam Harper, released in 2009.

Plot
In order to enjoy his retirement from the fire department, a father named Tom Cathkart (Danny DeVito) takes drastic measures to get his twenty-something, slacker sons to move out and fend for themselves. They continue to try to make their own film company, called Cathkart productions. Tom eventually gets sick of his sons slacking off and he leaves them alone while he takes his wife Mary Cathkart (Katey Sagal) and all the food with him, leaving his sons to no option but to take care of responsibilities in and around the house. They decide to open their own bed and breakfast and they let their friends to stay at the house for money. Eliot (Ryan Hansen) falls in love with Sarah (Caitlin Crosby) and his brother Quinn (Skyler Stone) gets jealous of his success with the film company. Eliot then leaves and his brother finds it hard to manage without him.

Cast
Danny DeVito as Tom Cathkart 
Katey Sagal as Mary Cathkart
Ryan Hansen as Eliot Cathkart
Skyler Stone as Quinn Cathkart
Caitlin Crosby as Sarah
Thomas F. Wilson as Fire Chief Henry Decker
Brie Larson as Suzy Decker
Kiernan Shipka as Tammy Tawber
John P. Farley as Nate
Tony Yalda as Gilroy
Nick Nervies as Brando
Parvesh Cheena as Zerban
Joe Koons as Trail
Quan Rico as Buster
Blaise Khufu as Chase
Matthew Glave as Hector

Production 
Production on House Broken, then titled No Place Like Home, began in 2007.

Reception
Common Sense Media reviewed the film, writing that "The cast of teens and young adults aren't without their charms, but the veteran cast of older adults (yes, Decker is the guy who played Biff in Back to the Future) should have been better, and maybe they could've been with a stronger script and more seasoned director."

References

External links
 
 
House Broken at The Film Catalogue

2009 films
American comedy films
2009 comedy films
2000s English-language films
2000s American films